Ned Kelly is a 1970 British-Australian biographical bushranger film. It was the seventh Australian feature film version of the story of 19th-century Australian bushranger Ned Kelly, and is notable for being the first Kelly film to be shot in colour.

The film was directed by Tony Richardson, and starred Mick Jagger in the title role. Scottish-born actor Mark McManus played the part of Kelly's friend Joe Byrne. It was a British production, but was filmed entirely in Australia, shot mostly around Braidwood in southern New South Wales, with a largely Australian supporting cast.

Plot
Ned Kelly is forced by police persecution to become a bushranger. He robs several banks and is eventually captured after the Siege of Glenrowan. He is hanged in Melbourne.

Cast

Mick Jagger as Ned Kelly
Geoff Gilmour as Steve Hart
Mark McManus as Joe Byrne
McManus had previously played Dan Kelly in Ballad for One Gun (1963).
Serge Lazareff as Wild Wright
Peter Sumner as Tom Lloyd
Ken Shorter as Aaron Sherritt
James Elliott as Pat O'Donnell
Clarissa Kaye as Mrs. Kelly
Diane Craig as Maggie Kelly
Sue Lloyd as Kate Kelly
Alexi Long as Grace Kelly
Ken Goodlet as Supt. Nicholson
Goodlet had previously played Kelly in a 1960 telemovie.
Frank Thring as Judge Sir Redmond Barry
Bruce Barry as George King
Tony Bazell as Mr. Scott
Allen Bickford as Dan Kelly
Robert Bruning as Sgt. Steele
Alexander Cann as McInnes
Janne Wesley as Caitlyn
Martyn Sanderson as Fitzpatrick
John Laws as Kennedy
Liam Reynolds as Lonigan
Lindsay Smith as McIntyre
John Gray as Stratton
Gerry Duggan as Father O'Hea

Development

Karel Reisz and Albert Finney
In the early 1960s, Karel Reisz and Albert Finney announced plans to make a film about Ned Kelly from a screenplay by David Storey. Finney and Reisz flew to Australia in October 1962 and spent ten weeks picking locations and doing research.

In January 1963, it was reported the film would star Finney and Angela Lansbury. The movie was meant to be Finney's next project after Tom Jones (1963) and filming was to start in March 1963.

The British arm of Columbia Pictures agreed to put up the entire budget. However, British labour union regulations required a mostly British crew, and the cost of putting them up in Australia put the budget beyond what Columbia were willing to pay. (Tom Jones had yet to be released.) Finney and Reisz went on to make Night Must Fall (1964) instead.

Following this, Finney was still meant to make the film. However, he and Reisz eventually dropped out.

Tony Richardson and Mick Jagger
The project passed on to Tom Jones director Tony Richardson, who wrote the script in collaboration with Ian Jones, a Melbourne writer and producer of TV drama and expert on Ned Kelly. According to Kevin Brownlow, Ian McKellen was originally set to play the lead but the producers went for Mick Jagger.

"I am taking this film very seriously", said Jagger at the time. "Kelly won't look anything like me. You wait and you'll see what I look like. I want to concentrate on being a character actor."

During pre-production, other filmmakers announced their own Ned Kelly projects including Tim Burstall, Gary Shead and Dino de Laurentiis.

Production
The making of the film was dogged by problems; even before production began, Actors' Equity and some of Kelly's descendants protested strongly about the casting of Jagger in the lead role, and about the film's proposed shooting location in country New South Wales, rather than in Victoria, where the Kellys had lived.

Jagger's girlfriend of the time, Marianne Faithfull, had come to Australia to play the lead female role (Ned's sister, Maggie), but their relationship was breaking up, and she took an overdose of sleeping tablets soon after arrival in Sydney. She was hospitalised in a coma, but recovered and was sent home. She was replaced by a then-unknown Australian actress, Diane Craig, then studying at NIDA.

Shooting began on 12 July 1969 and took ten weeks. During production, Jagger was slightly injured by a backfiring pistol, the cast and crew were dogged by illness, a number of costumes were destroyed by fire, and Jagger's co-star, Mark McManus, narrowly escaped serious injury when a horse-drawn cart in which he was riding overturned during filming.

Unlike most film versions, this is the first Ned Kelly film to feature the writing of "The Cameron Letter", one of Kelly's lesser-known and rarely published letters that was written to Donald Cameron, a member of the Parliament of Victoria. The letter was Kelly's first attempt to gain public sympathy. However, Kelly's well-known letter, The Jerilderie Letter, is omitted from the film.

Reception
The film was poorly received at its opening, and is still regarded as one of Richardson's least successful efforts. It was effectively disowned by Richardson and Jagger, neither of whom attended the London premiere. As late as 1980 Jagger claimed he had never seen the film. Gerry Fisher's cinematography, however, has been praised for its craftsmanship — repoussoir, shadow, reflection and understated lighting — giving the film a melancholy feel.

Arthur Krim of United Artists later did an assessment of the film as part of an evaluation of the company's inventory:
When we programmed this picture we thought Mick Jagger would be a big personality with the younger audience. Unfortunately, his other film Performance came out just before Ned Kelly and failed. We have every belief that Ned Kelly will not do well either. In addition, Tony Richardson, the filmmaker handled the material in a very slow-paced manner and we have not been able to persuade him to make the cuts necessary to improve the film. This is again a case of programming a film in a time of much greater optimism about the size of the so-called youth orientated – particularly starring one of the new folk heroes.

A.H. Weiler of the New York Times said,

Box office
Ned Kelly grossed $808,000 at the box office in Australia, which is equivalent to $7,716,400 in 2009 dollars.

Home media

Legacy
Ian Jones later wrote and produced (with his wife Bronwyn Binns) a mini-series on Kelly, The Last Outlaw, which aired on the Seven Network in 1980. Australian actor John Jarratt starred as Kelly.

The actual body armour costume worn by Jagger is on display at the Queanbeyan City Library, New South Wales, and the initials "MJ" are scratched on the inside. The head-piece, like its original, was stolen.

Soundtrack

The Ned Kelly soundtrack features music composed by Shel Silverstein and performed by Kris Kristofferson and Waylon Jennings and produced by Ron Haffkine, with one solo track sung by Jagger and one sung by Tom Ghent.

Track listing
Waylon Jennings – "Ned Kelly"
"Such is Life"
Mick Jagger – "The Wild Colonial Boy"
"What Do You Mean I Don’t Like"
Kris Kristofferson – "Son of a Scoundrel"
Waylon Jennings – "Shadow of the Gallows"
"If I Ever Kill"
Waylon Jennings – "Lonigan's Widow"
Kris Kristofferson – "Stoney Cold Ground"
"Ladies and Gentlemen"
Kris Kristofferson – "The Kelly's Keep Comin'"
Waylon Jennings – "Ranchin' in the Evenin'"
"Say"
Waylon Jennings – "Blame it on the Kellys"
Waylon Jennings – "Pleasures of a Sunday Afternoon"
Tom Ghent – "Hey Ned"

See also
 Cinema of Australia

References

External links
 
 
 
 
 Ned Kelly (1970 film) at the National Film and Sound Archive
Ned Kelly at Mickjagger.com
Ned Kelly at Oz Movies
Gaunson, Stephen (2010), ‘International Outlaws: Ned Kelly, Tony Richardson and the International co-production’, Studies in Australasian Cinema, Special Issue: ‘Australian International Pictures’, (eds) Adrian Danks and Constantine Verevis, 4.3, p. 253-263
Geoff Stanton, 'Like a Rolling Stone: The Untold Story of the Kelly Gang' at From the Barrellhouse 25 April 2011

1970 films
1970 Western (genre) films
1970s historical films
1970s biographical drama films
British biographical drama films
Australian biographical drama films
Films directed by Tony Richardson
United Artists films
Films set in colonial Australia
Films set in Victoria (Australia)
Bushranger films
Cultural depictions of Ned Kelly
Films set in the 19th century
Films set in 1880
Films set on trains
British Western (genre) films
1970 drama films
Biographical films about bandits
Australian films about revenge
Australian vigilante films
1970s English-language films
1970s British films